Yugoslavia competed at the 1951 Mediterranean Games held in Alexandria, Egypt.

Medals by sport

Medalists

External links
Yugoslavia at the 1951 Mediterranean Games at the Olympic Museum Belgrade website
1951 Official Report at the International Mediterranean Games Committee

Nations at the 1951 Mediterranean Games
1951
Mediterranean Games